Özünü Tanıt is an Azerbaijani reality television series on the Azad Azerbaijan TV television network, and part of the global British Got Talent series. Production has been made by CEO of Kaspi Global Productions Shamkhal Hasanli, under franchise license agreement between Kaspi Global and Fremantle Media (format owner). It is a talent show that features singers, dancers, sketch artists, comedians, and other performers of all ages competing for the advertised top prize of 60,000 Azerbaijani manat. The show debuted in February 2015. The three judges Murad Dadashov, Aygun Kazimova and ABD Malik.

Season 1 (2015) 
The first season began in 2015, and concluded with Elkhan L Mefisto (Elkhan Mammadov) as the winner.

Elkhan L Mefisto 1st show

Elkhan L Mefisto call

Elkhan L Mefisto 2nd show Final

References

External links 
Official Facebook Page
Official Youtube Page
Ozunu Tanit

Azerbaijan
Azerbaijani television shows
2015 Azerbaijani television series debuts
Azad Azerbaijan TV original programming